Leslie John William Newman (1878–1938) was an Australian entomologist born at Sandridge (Port Melbourne), Victoria, on 16 February 1878. He became an horticultural inspector for the government of Western Australia. While employed to assess insects of economic concern to introduced food plants, he encouraged staff to capture other species and assembled these into valuable entomological collections.

References 

 

Australian entomologists
Public servants of Western Australia
1878 births
1938 deaths
Australian horticulturists
People from Port Melbourne
Scientists from Melbourne